Ilani (also Romanized as Īlānī) is a village in Behi Dehbokri Rural District, Simmineh District, Bukan County, West Azerbaijan Province, Iran. At the 2006 census, its population was 163, in 29 families.

References 

Populated places in Bukan County